General elections were held in Japan on 6 July 1986 to elect the 512 members of the House of Representatives. This marks the last general election as of 2021 in which the LDP was able to obtain at least 300 seats in the House of Representatives, an event that only ever happened once before, in the 1960 election. This general election and 1960's are also tied for the highest number of seats ever obtained by the LDP in a general election, as both saw the LDP winning exactly 300 seats. However, the House of Representatives had fewer total seats in 1960, and so the popular vote for the LDP was actually stronger in 1960. Nonetheless, the 1986 general election also stands as the fourth strongest LDP showing in a general election in terms of the popular constituency votes.

Results

By prefecture

References

Japanese general election
General elections in Japan
General election
Japanese general election
Election and referendum articles with incomplete results